François-Xavier Dillmann (born 27 November 1949) is a French philologist who specializes in Old Norse studies.

Biography
François-Xavier Dillmann was born on 27 November 1949. Dillmann studied at the universities of Lille, Uppsala, Copenhagen, Iceland, Göttingen, Munich and Caen. He received a Ph.D. in Germanic studies at Caen in 1976 with a thesis on runes in Old Norse literature, and another Ph.D. in Scandinavian philology in 1986 with a thesis on Old Norse religion.

Since 1988, Dillmann has been Chair of the History and Philology of Ancient and Medieval Scandinavia at 4th Section (History and Philology) at the École pratique des hautes études. Dillmann is strongly influenced by the research of Georges Dumézil. He is the founder and President of the Société des études nordiques, and editor of its journal . He is a member of a large number of learned societies, such as the Royal Gustavus Adolphus Academy, Royal Swedish Academy of Letters, History and Antiquities, the Royal Norwegian Society of Sciences and Letters, the Royal Society of the Humanities at Uppsala, the Norwegian Academy of Science and Letters, the Royal Society of Sciences in Uppsala, and a corresponding member of the Académie des Inscriptions et Belles-Lettres. Dillmann was written a number of works on Viking Age history and culture, Old Norse religion and literature, and runes.

Selected works
 Snorri Sturluson, L’Edda. Récits de mythologie nordique. Traduit du vieil islandais, introduit et annoté par François-Xavier Dillmann, Paris, Gallimard (L’aube des peuples), 1991, 233 p.
 Histoire des rois de Norvège (Heimskringla) par Snorri Sturluson. Première partie : Des origines mythiques de la dynastie à la bataille de Svold. Traduit du vieil islandais, introduit et annoté par François-Xavier Dillmann, Paris, Gallimard (L’aube des peuples), 2000, 706 p. [Cet ouvrage a été couronné par l’Académie royale Gustave Adolphe en novembre 2000.]
 Les magiciens dans l’Islande ancienne. Études sur la représentation de la magie islandaise et de ses agents dans les sources littéraires norroises, Upsal, Kungl. Gustav Adolfs Akademien för svenk folkkultur (Acta Academiae Regiae Gustavi Adolphi, XCII), 2006, XVIII – 779 p.

See also
 Claude Lecouteux
 Lucien Musset

Sources

 

1949 births
French philologists
Germanic studies scholars
Living people
Members of the Académie des Inscriptions et Belles-Lettres
Members of the Norwegian Academy of Science and Letters
Members of the Royal Gustavus Adolphus Academy
Old Norse studies scholars
Royal Norwegian Society of Sciences and Letters
Runologists
Writers on Germanic paganism